December 12, 2012, is the 12th day in December, 2012.  Depending on context, the date may refer to:

The official opening of the New Doha International Airport, in Qatar
World Hoop Day
A cataclysmic or transformative event associated with a 2012 phenomenon
Aaron Rodgers Day in Wisconsin
The last consecutive date until 01/01/2101
12-12-12: The Concert for Sandy Relief, a concert held at Madison Square Garden in New York City on December 12, 2012
Independence Day in Kenya: Anniversary for the Republic of Kenya
 12-12-12 (album) — Headplate album. 

December 2012 events